Matthew Mahan (born November 18, 1982) is an American politician and tech entrepreneur, now serving his first term as the Mayor of San Jose. He previously served as the District 10 Councilmember representing the Almaden Valley, Blossom Valley, and Vista Park neighborhoods. Mahan also served as the co-founder and CEO of Brigade Media, a tech company focused on civic engagement.

Early life and education 
Mahan was raised in Watsonville, California. He attended Bellarmine College Preparatory in San Jose on a low-income scholarship. While in high school, Mahan worked with former State Senator Jim Beall and former Santa Clara Counsel Ann Ravel. 

Mahan graduated from Harvard University in 2005.
In college, Mahan served as President of the Harvard Undergraduate Council.

Career 
After Harvard, Mahan spent the next year building irrigation systems in Bolivia. He then joined Teach for America where he taught at Alum Rock Middle School.

In 2008, Mahan joined a tech startup led by Sean Parker and Joe Green. Together, they formed Causes, an early Facebook application focused on grassroots and public engagement that helped raise money for nonprofit organizations. Mahan became CEO and president of Causes in 2013.

In 2014, Mahan launched Brigade with investments from Parker, Ron Conway, Marc Benioff, and others. Brigade was created as a social medium for civil engagement. In 2019, Brigade was acqui-hired by Pinterest and its technology was purchased by Countable.  Writer Douglas Rushkoff would offer a criticism about the use case for Brigade in 2022, writing that "Brigade's engineers built some clever algorithms for matching voters with their districts and elected representatives, but no one had checked to see whether civic tech developers were in need of a centralized hub. The startup was shuttered in 2019." He went on to group Brigade alongside "the 2020 Covid-19 Global Hackathon," as, "in the words of civic tech journalist and historian Micah Sifry, 'a big fat nothingburger.'" 

In early 2020, Mahan entered the San Jose City Council District 10 race. He won with 58% of the vote, and in January 2021, was sworn in as the District 10 Council member for the city of San Jose.

In September 2021, Mahan became a candidate for Mayor of San Jose, focusing on a platform of accountability in government. He proposed an accountability dashboard which would track progress on issues like crime and homelessness. He also pledged to end the current system of automatic raises for politicians and city department heads unless progress is shown.

In November 2022, he was elected mayor of San Jose, defeating Santa Clara County supervisor Cindy Chavez in a close race. He will serve a two-year term and be up for re-election in 2024.

Personal life 

Mahan married Silvia-Wedad Scandar in 2012. The couple met at Harvard in their freshman year at school. They have two children and live in San Jose's Almaden Valley neighborhood.

At Harvard, he lived in the same dorm as Mark Zuckerberg.

References 

1982 births
California Democrats
Harvard University alumni
Living people
Mayors of San Jose, California
San Jose City Council members
Teach For America alumni